Phylloicus is a genus of caddisflies in the family Calamoceratidae. There are more than 40 described species in Phylloicus.

Species
These 43 species belong to the genus Phylloicus:

 Phylloicus abdominalis (Ulmer, 1905)
 Phylloicus aculeatus (Blanchard, 1851)
 Phylloicus aeneus (Hagen, 1861)
 Phylloicus amazonas Prather
 Phylloicus angustior Ulmer, 1905
 Phylloicus brevior Banks, 1915
 Phylloicus bromelianum Mueller, 1880
 Phylloicus camargoi Quinteiro, Calor & Froehlich, 2011
 Phylloicus centralis (Navas, 1924)
 Phylloicus chalybeus (Hagen, 1861)
 Phylloicus cordatus Prather
 Phylloicus crenatus (Navas, 1916)
 Phylloicus cubanus Banks, 1924
 Phylloicus elegans Hogue & Denning in Denning, Resh & Hogue, 1983
 Phylloicus elektoros Prather
 Phylloicus ephippium Prather
 Phylloicus farri Flint, 1968
 Phylloicus fenestratus Flint, 1974
 Phylloicus gomezi Razo-González, 2018
 Phylloicus iridescens Banks, 1941
 Phylloicus lituratus Banks, 1920
 Phylloicus llaviuco Prather
 Phylloicus maculatus (Banks, 1901)
 Phylloicus magnus Banks, 1913
 Phylloicus major Mueller, 1880
 Phylloicus medius Mueller, 1880
 Phylloicus mexicanus (Banks, 1900)
 Phylloicus mirabilis Cavalcante, Dumas & Nessimian, 2018
 Phylloicus monticolus Flint, 1968
 Phylloicus obliquus Navás, 1931
 Phylloicus ornatus (Banks, 1909)
 Phylloicus panamensis Prather
 Phylloicus passulatus Prather
 Phylloicus pirapo Prather
 Phylloicus plaumanni Flint, 1983
 Phylloicus priapulus Denning & Hogue in Denning, Resh & Hogue, 1983
 Phylloicus pulchrus Flint, 1964
 Phylloicus sallesi BarceloS-silva, Desidério & Pes, 2017
 Phylloicus spectabilis Martynov, 1912
 Phylloicus superbus Banks, 1938
 Phylloicus tricalcaratus (Ulmer, 1905)
 Phylloicus trichothylax Prather
 Phylloicus velteni Wichard, 2006

References

Further reading

 
 
 

Trichoptera genera
Articles created by Qbugbot
Integripalpia